Nairobi Airport may refer to:

 Jomo Kenyatta International Airport, the major airport in Nairobi and Kenya, handling most inbound and outbound flights
 Wilson Airport (Kenya), a smaller second airport in Nairobi serving mostly light aircraft and small airlines